Gustave Doret (20 September 1866 – 19 April 1943) was a Swiss composer and conductor.

Career
Doret was born in 1866 in Aigle, Switzerland. He studied at the Berlin Academy of Music with Joseph Joachim, and then at the Conservatoire de Paris with Théodore Dubois and Jules Massenet. His career as a conductor began in 1894 in Paris, where he led the first performance of Debussy's Prélude à l'après-midi d'un faune. He was second conductor of the Concerts d'Harcourt from 1893 to 1895 and director of the Opéra-Comique in the 1890s and 1900s. He was also the founder of the Théâtre du Jorat, in Mézières.

His two serious operas, heavily indebted to Massenet, were performed in Paris; his light opera and other stage works were far more popular across French-speaking Europe. In 1914, Doret returned to Switzerland and began studying local popular music and folk music traditions. He also wrote for Swiss newspapers and wrote a memoir, Temps et contretemps, published in 1942.

Most of his output was vocal, and included operas, music theatre pieces, one oratorio, choral music, and more than 300 songs. His only instrumental works were two orchestral pieces, a string quartet, and a piano quintet. His work was part of the music event in the art competition at the 1912 Summer Olympics.

Doret died in 1943 in Lausanne.

Awards
Doret was made a Knight of the Legion of Honour (decree: 17 February 1915).

Works
 Les Sept paroles du Christ (1895), oratorio
 Les Armaillis (1900), opera
 Fête des Vignerons (1905)
 Aliénor (1910), stage music
 La Nuit des Quatre Temps (1910), stage music
 Tell (1914), stage music
 Fête des Vignerons (1927) 
 La Servante d'Evolène (1937)

References

Further reading
Don Randel, The Harvard Biographical Dictionary of Music. Harvard, 1996, p. 223
Delphine Vincent, "Gustave Doret et le théâtre du Jorat". In: Passé simple, no 52,‎ February 2020, pp. 25-27 
Delphine Vincent (dir.), Mythologies romandes: Gustave Doret et la musique nationale, Berne, 2018 

Jacques Tchamkerten: "Gustave Doret". In: Andreas Kotte (ed.): Theaterlexikon der Schweiz – Dictionnaire du théâtre en Suisse. Vol. 1, Chronos, Zürich 2005, p. 478  
Andrea Della Corte and Guido M. Gatti: "Gustave Doret". In: Dizionario di musica, Torino, Paravia, 1956, p. 195

External links
 Swiss National Sound Archives - Gustave Doret - 78 rpm discs
Operone.de: Doret 
Musicologie.org: Gustave Doret 
Patrinum (Bibliothèque cantonale et universitaire de Lausanne): database of personalities of Vaud - Gustave Doret 

1866 births
1943 deaths
19th-century classical composers
19th-century male musicians
20th-century classical composers
20th-century conductors (music)
20th-century male musicians
Male conductors (music)
Officiers of the Légion d'honneur
Olympic competitors in art competitions
Romantic composers
Swiss classical composers
Swiss conductors (music)
Swiss male classical composers
20th-century Swiss composers